Master Series is a compilation album by Elkie Brooks. It was issued on CD in 1997 by A&M and distributed only in Germany.

Track listing 
"Fool If You Think"
"Lilac Wine"
"Pearls"
"Why Don’t You Say It"
"Don’t Cry Out Loud"
"He's a Rebel"
"Warm and Tender Love"
"Since You Went Away"
"We All Have Our Dreams"
"Only Love Can Break Your Heart"
"The Runaway"
"You Did Something for Me"
"He Could Have Been an Army"
"Do Right Woman"
"Where Do We Go from Here"
"Got to Be a Winner"
"Live Laugh and Love"
"Love Potion #9"

1997 compilation albums
Elkie Brooks albums
A&M Records compilation albums